The Final Extra is a 1927 American silent crime film directed by James P. Hogan and starring Marguerite De La Motte, Grant Withers and John Miljan.

Synopsis
With the assistance of a chorus girl, an aspiring young newspaperman takes over his colleagues investigation into a theatrical producer heading a bootlegging operation.

Cast
 Marguerite De La Motte as Ruth Collins
 Grant Withers as Pat Riley 
 John Miljan as Mervin Le Roy 
 Frank Beal as Tom Collins 
 Joseph W. Girard as Editor Williams 
 Billy 'Red' Jones as Buddy Collins 
 Leon Holmes as The Copyboy

References

Bibliography
 Munden, Kenneth White. The American Film Institute Catalog of Motion Pictures Produced in the United States, Part 1. University of California Press, 1997.

External links

1927 films
1927 crime films
American crime films
Films directed by James Patrick Hogan
American silent feature films
1920s English-language films
American black-and-white films
Gotham Pictures films
1920s American films